Burning Annie is an American independent comedy film starring Gary Lundy, Sara Downing, Kim Murphy, Brian Klugman, Jay Paulson, Rini Bell, Todd Duffey, and Kathleen Rose Perkins. It is the directorial debut of Van Flesher.  The film was produced by Randy Mack of Armak Productions and in 2007 was distributed by Lightyear Entertainment via Warner Bros. In 2017 it was re-distributed by the filmmakers through Sundance Institute's Creative Distribution Initiative.

Plot
A dysfunctional romantic comedy about Max, a college student in 1998 who's obsessed with Woody Allen's film Annie Hall.  He believes the film holds all the answers to life, including the futility of romance. Just as he begins to suspect the film might actually be ruining his life, he meets Julie, a young woman who might be the modern day equivalent of Annie Hall herself, and goes into a romantic tailspin.

Cast
 Gary Lundy as Max
 Sara Downing as Julie
 Kim Murphy as Beth (as Kim Murphy Zandell)
 Brian Klugman as Charles
 Jay Paulson as Sam
 Rini Bell as Amanda
 Todd Duffey as Tommy
 Kathleen Rose Perkins as Jen
 David Hall as Andy 
 Jason Risner as Scott
 Carrie Freedle as Sara

Release

After premiering at the Hamptons International Film Festival in 2003, the film spent three years on the film festival circuit, playing as a work-in-progress. It was eventually released by Lightyear Entertainment. Its theatrical run began February 7, 2007 at the Two Boots/Pioneer Theater in East Village, Manhattan, New York City, and it was released on DVD was on March 20, 2007. In 2017 the filmmakers re-acquired the rights to the film and re-released it on HD (high-definition) streaming platforms in dozens of countries, via the Sundance Institute's Creative Distribution Initiative.

Awards and honors
2004 MassBay Film Festival (Worcester, MA.)
 Won: Best Feature

2004 West Virginia Filmmakers Film Festival
 Won: Best Feature

2004 Strictly Midwestern Movies and Short Hits (SMMASH)
 Won: Best Director
 Won: Best Screenplay
 Won: Best Actor
 Nominated: Best Supporting Actor
 Nominated: Best Actress
 Nominated: Best Feature
 Nominated: Audience Award

2005 Seattle's True Independent Film Festival (STIFF)
 Won: Best Debut Feature
 Won: Best Use of a Donnie Darko Cast Member

Citations

General sources 
 
 
 
 http://movies.nytimes.com/2007/02/07/movies/07burn.html
 https://www.variety.com/review/VE1117922407.html
 https://nymag.com/movies/listings/rv_46896.htm
 http://movies.tvguide.com/burning-annie/review/286227
 http://www.villagevoice.com/2007-01-30/film/burning-annie/
 https://www.moviemaker.com/archives/series/how_they_did_it/burning-annie-found-self-distribution-after-a-decade-of-catastrophes
 http://seligfilmnews.com/burning-annie-interviews-with-randy-mack-van-flesher-and-gary-lundy/

2004 films
2003 comedy films
2003 films
Films shot in West Virginia
American comedy films
Films set in the 1990s
2004 comedy films
2000s English-language films
2000s American films